List of all Greek Orthodox parishes and monasteries in the Australian state of New South Wales (NSW) and the territory of the Australian Capital Territory (ACT).

Greek Orthodox Archdiocese of Australia

The majority of Greek Orthodox church communities in New South Wales and the Australian Capital Territory are under the spiritual jurisdiction of the Greek Orthodox Archdiocese of Australia. These church communities are under the Archdiocese's First Archdiocesan District of New South Wales and the Australian Capital Territory which consists of 45 parishes, 1 cathedral, 1 chapel and 3 monasteries.

Bishop Emilianos of Meloes leads the Archdiocesan District, who is auxiliary to the Greek Orthodox Archdiocese of Australia's Archbishop Makarios (Griniezakis) of Australia. The Greek Orthodox Archdiocese of Australia is a jurisdiction of the Ecumenical Patriarchate of Constantinople.

The First Archdiocesan District covers many church communities including some of Australia's most populous areas such as Sydney, Canberra, Newcastle, Wollongong, the Central Coast and multiple regional areas of New South Wales and the Australian Capital Territory. Churches and monasteries under the First Archdiocesan District are listed below:

Parishes and Monasteries in NSW & ACT

Other Greek Orthodox Church Jurisdictions

There are few smaller Greek Orthodox church community organisations in New South Wales and the Australian Capital Territory that are governed by other church organisations or independent bodies. These church communities are listed below:

See also

 Archbishop Makarios of Australia
 Australian Capital Territory
 Autocephalous Greek Orthodox Church of America and Australia
 Ecumenical Patriarchate of Constantinople
 Greek Australians
 Greek Old Calendarists
 Greek Orthodox Archdiocese of Australia
 New South Wales

References

Churches in New South Wales
Lists of churches in Australia
Eastern Orthodoxy in Australia
Greek-Australian culture in New South Wales
Eastern Orthodoxy-related lists
Lists of buildings and structures in New South Wales